is a Japanese manga series written and illustrated by Ayumi Ishii. It has been serialized in Shogakukan's Monthly Shōnen Sunday since May 2009, with its chapters collected in twenty-two tankōbon volumes as of February 2022.

A ten-episode anime television series adaptation was broadcast on Fuji TV from July to September 2014. An eleven-episode television drama adaptation was also broadcast on Fuji TV from October to December 2014. A live-action film premiered in Japan in January 2016.

As of February 2016, the Nobunaga Concerto manga had over 3.5 million copies in circulation. In 2012, the manga won the 57th Shogakukan Manga Award for the shōnen category.

Plot
The story centers around Saburō, a high school boy who time-travels to Japan's Sengoku Era. He must become Oda Nobunaga, the famed warlord who helps unite Japan.

Characters

Main characters

Played by: Shun Oguri
Saburo is a high school boy who finds himself traveling back in time to Japan's Sengoku Era. He meets Oda Nobunaga who asks him Saburo to impersonate him because they look like identical. He occasionally uses his textbook regarding Nobunaga's life to guide him through the events he needs to create.

Played by: Shun Oguri
The real Oda Nobunaga. Unable to withstand the political pressure as Nobunaga, he has the identical twin, Saburo take his place while he travels around the country. He eventually ends up taking over the Akechi Clan after the previous leader had no heir, and now works under Saburō (fake Nobunaga) as Akechi Mitsuhide.

Played by: Kou Shibasaki
Kichō is Nobunaga's wife

Played by: Takayuki Yamada
Tokichiro was originally a spy from the Imagawa, sent to ruin the Oda. Tokichiro initially attempted to incite rebellion through Nobuyuki as well as acting as a stable boy for the Oda army in the Imagawa's advance. Both areas failed as Nobuyuki was betrayed by Katsuie and, due to a miscommunication, he sends incorrect info to Yoshimito, leading to his death at Okehazama. With no place to go, he bides his time under Nobunaga, waiting for the perfect opportunity to kill him.

Played by: Kiko Mizuhara
Oichi is Nobunaga's younger sister.

Other characters

Played by: Osamu Mukai

Played by: Masahiro Takashima
Originally a retainer of Nobuyuki, Katsuie was initially unable to understand Nobunaga's behaviour, and attempted to kill Matsudaira Motoyasu in order to show Nobunaga's incompetence. Years later, he soon realizes that Nobunaga not only has the support of the people, but also has the ambition to rule the land. Siding with Nobunaga instead, he is still often baffled by his lord's decision making.

Played by: Taisuke Fujigaya
A violent man, he was found by Nobunaga fighting in the streets. As punishment for his rowdy behaviour, he was not allowed to serve in the army until after Nobunaga's first few battles.

Played by: Shinnosuke Abe
Like Toshiie, Narimasa was a violent person and was fighting Toshiie when they were both scouted by Nobunaga. Later on, he becomes a full-fledged officer of the Oda.

Played by: Masanobu Sakata

Played by: Denden

Played by: Gaku Hamada
Initially a young hostage for the Oda, Motoyasu becomes indebted to Nobunaga after he rescues the young child's life from Katsuie's assassination attempt. Being given Nobunaga's modern day pornographic magazine, he eventually forms an alliance with the Oda after the collapse of the Imagawa forces at Okehazama to repay the debt to Nobunaga.

Played by: Naohito Fujiki
A strategist that initially served Saito Tatsuoki, he became dissatisfied with his lord's complacency over Inabayama Castle's victories against Nobunaga, and proceeds to take the castle for himself. Interested in Nobunaga's vision of the world, he eventually turns against the Saito, and joins the Oda forces.

Played by: Issei Takahashi

Played by: Kunio Murai

Played by: Yoshiyuki Morishita

Played by: Takumi Kitamura

Played by: Keisuke Horibe

Played by: Arata Furuta
Originally a Yakuza member before being transported to the past, Hisahide relishes the chaos of the Sengoku period, believing it to be a battle where only the strongest win. Meeting Nobunaga after his rejection of the Shogun's letter to attack the Oda, Hisahide offers his loose loyalty to Nobunaga until the time he can rebel.

Played by: Yūya Yagira
Nobunaga's younger brother, whom he spites to the core. Nobuyuki, while afraid of Nobunaga, was also tired of his brother's erratic behaviour. In his brother's youth, Nobuyuki had Nohime kidnapped, which was exposed by Nobunaga in front of their father. Years later, he is incited into rebellion by Kinoshita, falsely believing that the Imagawa would support him as the lord of Owari. Failing in his rebellion, he attempts to kill Nobunaga once more when he is sick, only to be betrayed by Katsuie. After his third failure, he commits suicide, but encourages Nobunaga to take the world without the permission of others.

An elderly man who is the tutor of Nobunaga, he is befuddled by Nobunaga's lax behaviour and constantly remonstrates his lord for his laziness. While reviewing conscripts, he notices that Kinoshita is a spy for another warlord and rejects him. Eventually, he is murdered by Kinoshita and another Imagawa spy, and dies telling Nobunaga to not let the world think him a fool. Kinoshita would later kill his associate in order to be able to infiltrate the Oda Army.

Played by: Toshiyuki Nishida
The Lord of Mino and the father of Nohime, he was originally a policeman named Nagai Shinichi, who had a family with a daughter. Travelling to the past mysteriously like Saburo, he stays at the Sengoku Period for 30 years. Upon seeing Saburo's school uniform, he gives the younger man his uniform, and later his pistol and a letter to his original daughter and another to Nohime. Like in history, he is killed by his sons in the conflict at Mino.

Played by: Katsuya

Originally a batter for an unknown professional baseball team, Yasuke was transported to the Sengoku period, where he is found by Nobunaga. While taken in as an officer, he is bewildered by the savage culture of the time period as well as his baseball bat being mistaken as a weapon.

Played by: Hirofumi Arai

Media

Manga
Nobunaga Concerto is written and illustrated by Ayumi Ishii. Ishii started the manga in the first ever issue of Shogakukan's Monthly Shōnen Sunday, the June 2009 issue, released on May 12, 2009. Shogakukan has collected its chapters into individual tankōbon volumes. The first volume was released on November 12, 2009. As of February 10, 2022, twenty-two volumes have been released. The series will end with the release of its 23rd volume.

Volume list

Anime
A 10-episode anime television series adaptation was announced in May 2014. The series is directed by Yūsuke Fujikawa, scripted by Natsuko Takahashi and music composed by Masaru Yokoyama. The series aired on Fuji TV from July 12 to September 20, 2014. The series was streamed worldwide outside of Asia on Crunchyroll.

Episode list

Drama
An 11-episode Japanese television drama was announced in May 2014. It stars Shun Oguri as Saburo and Nobunaga. It was broadcast on Fuji TV from October 13 to December 22, 2014.

Live-action film

A live-action film adaptation was announced in May 2014. It features the same cast from the television drama and premiered in Japan on January 23, 2016.

Reception
As of February 2016, the manga had over 3.5 million copies in circulation. The series placed 10th on Kono Manga ga Sugoi!s 2012 list of Top 10 Manga for Male Readers. In 2012, Nobunaga Concerto won the 57th Shogakukan Manga Award for the shōnen category. It was nominated for the 5th Manga Taishō Award in 2012, and ranked 3rd with 57 points.

References

External links
 
Official anime website 

 
2009 manga
2014 Japanese television series debuts
2014 Japanese television series endings
Anime series based on manga
Comics about time travel
Cultural depictions of Oda Nobunaga
Films about time travel
Fuji TV dramas
Fuji TV original programming
Historical anime and manga
Manga adapted into films
Manga series
Shogakukan manga
Shōnen manga
Japanese time travel television series
Winners of the Shogakukan Manga Award for shōnen manga
Works about Oda Nobunaga